Gibbosporina is a genus of 13 species of foliose lichens in the family Pannariaceae. It contains species that molecular phylogenetic analysis clustered together in a clade previously referred to as the "Physma"-group. Despite their morphological differences, this group shares several uniting characteristics. They have ring-like excipular margins around the thallus; strongly amyloid internal ascus structures; well-developed perispores (a colorless, often gelatinous layer that envelops a spore) that feature irregular gibbae (irregular bumps), but not verrucae (small, rounded wart-like protuberances); lacks secondary compounds than can be detected by thin-layer chromatography; and have tropical distributions.

Taxonomy
It was circumscribed as a new genus in 2016 by Arve Elvebakk, Soon Gyu Hong and Per Magnus Jørgensen. The type species of the genus was assigned to Gibbosporina boninensis, originally described in 1969 by Syo Kurokawa as Psoroma boninense. The genus name, which combines the Latin gibbus ("with hump-like swellings") with spora, refers to the characteristic spore feature.

Species
Gibbosporina acuminata  – Australia; the Philippines
Gibbosporina amphorella  – New Caledonia
Gibbosporina bifrons  – Malaysia; New Caledonia; the Philippines; Solomon Islands
Gibbosporina boninensis 
Gibbosporina cyanea  – Sri Lanka
Gibbosporina didyma  – Mauritius; Réunion
Gibbosporina elixii  – Australia
Gibbosporina leptospora  – Australia; Fiji; New Caledonia; Papua New Guinea
Gibbosporina mascarena 
Gibbosporina nitida  – Australia; Fiji; Papua New Guinea; the Philippines
Gibbosporina papillospora  – the Philippines
Gibbosporina sphaerospora  – Australia; Fiji, Indonesia; Malaysia; Papua New Guinea; the Philippines; Samoa
Gibbosporina thamnophora  – Australia; Papua New Guinea

The species Gibbosporina phyllidiata was originally included in this genus, but later research showed that the lichen contained the secondary chemical pannarin and was therefore moved to genus Pannaria with the new name P. melanesica (a new name was required as Pannaria phyllidiata already existed for a different species).

References

 
Peltigerales genera
Lichen genera
Taxa described in 2016
Taxa named by Per Magnus Jørgensen
Taxa named by Arve Elvebakk